= Estación Pintados =

Railway station in Chile

Overview
- Status: Inactive
- Locale: Pintados, Pozo Almonte, Tarapacá Region

History
- Opened: 1893
- Closed: 1975

Estación Pintados was a Chilean railway station. It was located in the Tarapacá Region about 30 km (19 mi) southeast of the capital Iquique. It acquired notoriety as it was the head of the Longitudinal Norte railroad and the Railroad from Iquique to Pintados and around it a town was formed that is currently abandoned.

== History ==
The station began operating in 1893, when the section of the Tarapacá Nitrate Railroad (FCS) between San Antonio and Lagunas was inaugurated. In 1913, the section of the Longitudinal Norte railway, which was built between Pintados and Baquedano, came into operation, so in subsequent years the station became the terminal of said line and combination between both systems, so that it could continue to Zapiga and Pisagua by means of a change of train since both systems have different tracks. In 1928, with the construction of the railway from Iquique to Pintados, lines built by the state extended to Iquique season, although they were operated separately until 1957.

The station stopped providing services when the transportation of passengers in the old North Network of the State Railways Company ended in June 1975.
